THC is tetrahydrocannabinol, the main active chemical compound in cannabis.

THC or ThC may also refer to:

Arts, entertainment, and media
 THC (band), a trip hop band from California, US
 THC, an abbreviation for the film company The H Collective
 Texas Hippie Coalition, a rock band from Texas, US
 "The History Channel", now History (U.S. TV channel)

Enterprises and organizations
 Taiwan Halal Center, an organization in Taipei, Taiwan
 Tenet Healthcare (NYSE symbol), US
 Texas Historical Commission
 The Hotel Collection
 Tower Hamlets College, in London, England
 Transport Holding Company, a British Government owned company of the 1960s

Science
 Temperate herbaceous clade, a monophyletic clade of legumes
 Tetrahydrochrysene, an estrogenic and antiestrogenic compound
 Thermohaline circulation, an ocean current
 Thorium(IV) carbide (ThC)
 Total hydrocarbon content, a measure of the fraction of hydrocarbons in a fluid, measured using a flame ionization detector

Other uses
 Tuyamuyun Hydro Complex, a system of interconnected reservoirs and a series of canals on the lower Amu Darya River, bordering Turkmenistan and Uzbekistan